The Silver Legion of America, commonly known as the Silver Shirts, was an underground American fascist and Nazi sympathizer organization founded by William Dudley Pelley and headquartered in Asheville, North Carolina.

History
Pelley was a former journalist, novelist and screenwriter turned spiritualist who, by 1931, had begun to promote antisemitic views, asserting that Jews were possessed by demons. He formed the Silver Legion with the goal to bring about "spiritual and political renewal", inspired by the success of Adolf Hitler's Nazi movement in Germany.
  
A nationalist, fascist group, the paramilitary Silver Legion wore a uniform modeled after the Nazi's brown shirts (SA), consisting of a silver shirt with a blue tie, along with a campaign hat and blue corduroy trousers with leggings. The uniform shirts bore a scarlet letter L over the heart, which according to Pelley was "standing for Love, Loyalty, and Liberation." The blocky slab serif L-emblem was in a typeface similar to the present-day Rockwell Extra Bold. The organizational flag was a plain silver field with such a red L in the canton at the upper left. By 1934, the Legion claimed 15,000 members.

Legion leader Pelley called for a "Christian Commonwealth" in America that would combine the principles of nationalism and theocracy, while excluding Jews and non-whites. He claimed he would save America from Jewish communists just as "Mussolini and his Black Shirts saved Italy and as Hitler and his Brown Shirts saved Germany." Pelley ran in the 1936 presidential election on a third-party ticket under the Christian Party banner. Pelley hoped to seize power in a "silver revolution" and set himself as dictator of the United States. He would be called "the Chief" just like other fascist world leaders who had similar titles such "Der Führer" for Adolf Hitler and "II Duce" for Benito Mussolini. However, the Democratic President Franklin D. Roosevelt handily won the reelection, and Pelley failed to figure among the top four. By around 1937, the Silver Legion's membership had declined to about 5,000.

Pelley disbanded the organization after the December 1941 attack on Pearl Harbor.

On January 20, 1942, Pelley was sentenced to serve two to three years in prison by Superior Court Judge F. Don Phillips, in Asheville, North Carolina, for violating terms of probation of a 1935 conviction for violating North Carolina security laws. The same sentence had been suspended pending good behavior, but the court found that during that period Pelley had published false and libelous statements, published inaccurate reports and advertising, and supported a secret military organization.

In popular culture

 Sinclair Lewis's novel It Can't Happen Here depicts a fascist takeover of the United States by an anti-Roosevelt demagogue who claims inspiration from the Silver Legion of America.
The grand strategy game Hearts of Iron IV depicts the Silver Legion as its fascist archetype of the United States, as the Free American Empire.

See also
 Authoritarianism
 Christian Identity
 Christian nationalism
 Christian Nationalist Crusade
 Christian Party (United States, 1930s)
 Creativity (religion)
 German American Bund
 Political uniform
Ulrich Fleischhauer
 Ku Klux Klan
 Neo-Confederate
 Radical right (United States)
 White nationalism
 Wotansvolk
 List of fascist movements
 List of Ku Klux Klan organizations
 List of neo-Nazi organizations
 List of organizations designated by the Southern Poverty Law Center as hate groups
 List of white nationalist organizations

References
Notes

Further reading
 Allen, Joe "'It Can't Happen Here?': Confronting the Fascist Threat in the US in the Late 1930s," International Socialist Review, Part One: whole no. 85 (Sept.-Oct. 2012), pp. 26–35; Part Two: whole no. 87 (Jan.-Feb. 2013), pp. 19–28.
 
 Ribuffo, Leo Paul The Old Christian Right: The Protestant Far Right from the Great Depression to the Cold War. Philadelphia: Temple University Press, 1983.
 Spivak, John L. Secret Armies: The New Technique of Nazi Warfare. New York: Modern Age Books, 1939.
 Werly, John The Millenarian Right: William Dudley Pelley and the Silver Legion of America. PhD dissertation. Syracuse University, 1972.
 Yeadon, Glen. The Nazi Hydra in America. Joshua Tree, CA: Progressive Press, 2008.

External links
 Photo of a Silver Legion of America meeting in the 1930s:
 The Holocaust Chronicle: PROLOGUE: Roots of the Holocaust, page 89
 The American Jewish Committees' archive on the Silver Shirts:
 Atlas Obscura article on Rustic Canyon's Murphy Ranch

1933 establishments in the United States
1941 disestablishments in the United States
American fascist movements
Antisemitism in the United States
Asheville, North Carolina
Clothing in politics
Organizations established in 1933
Organizations disestablished in 1941
Paramilitary organizations based in the United States
Political parties established in 1933
Social history of the United States
White supremacist groups in the United States